Tsimlyansky District is an administrative and municipal district (raion), one of the forty-three in Rostov Oblast, Russia. It is located in the east of the oblast. Its administrative center is the town of Tsimlyansk. Population: 34,222 (2010 Census);  The population of Tsimlyansk accounts for 43.9% of the district's total population.

References

Notes

Sources

Districts of Rostov Oblast